Pierre Ryckmans may refer to:

Pierre Ryckmans (governor-general) (1891-1959), Belgian civil servant, Governor-General of the Belgian Congo (1934-46)
Pierre Ryckmans (writer) (1935-2014), Belgian-Australian writer, sinologist, essayist and literary critic